USS LST-1010 was an  in the United States Navy during World War II. She was transferred to the South Korean Navy as ROKS Un Bong (LST-807).

Construction and commissioning 
LST-1010 was laid down on 22 February 1944 at  Bethlehem Steel Company, Quincy, Massachusetts. Launched on 29 March 1944 and commissioned on 25 April 1944.

Service in United States Navy 
During World War II, LST-1010 was assigned to the Asiatic-Pacific theater and participated in the assault and occupation of Okinawa Gunto in May and June 1945. Following the war, LST-1010 performed occupation duty in the Far East until mid-September 1945. She returned to the United States and was decommissioned and transferred to United States Army on 4 April 1947. She returned to the US Navy on 1 March 1950 and assigned to the Pacific Reserve Fleet.

Under provisions of the Military Assistance Program, she was transferred to the Republic of Korea on 22 March 1955, and served the ROK navy as Un Bong (LST-807).

LST-1010 earned two battle star for World War II service.

Service in South Korean Navy 
Un Bong was used for various training purposes and participated in the Vietnam War from 1966 to 1972.

The ship was retired from the Korean Navy in 2006, after 51 years of service. Plans were eventually made by the City of Gimpo Marine Park, to establish a ship museum, depicting the history of the ship from its original U.S. Navy commissioning in 1944.

References

LST-542-class tank landing ships
1944 ships
Ships transferred from the United States Navy to the Republic of Korea Navy
World War II amphibious warfare vessels of the United States
Vietnam War amphibious warfare vessels of the United States
Museum ships in South Korea
Ships built in Quincy, Massachusetts